The twelfth season of American talent show competition series America's Got Talent was broadcast on NBC from May 30 to September 20, 2017. Following the previous season, Nick Cannon ended his involvement with the program following a disagreement with the network, and was replaced as host by Tyra Banks before production of the new season began. The guest judges for this season's Judge Cuts stage included Chris Hardwick, DJ Khaled, Laverne Cox and Seal.

The twelfth season was won by singing ventriloquist Darci Lynne, with singer Angelica Hale finishing second, and glow-light dance troupe Light Balance placing third. During its broadcast, the season averaged around 12.66 million viewers, becoming the most watched in the program's history to date. It was dedicated to the memory of a participant who had died outside of filming, after auditioning for the competition.

Season overview 

Open auditions took place in late 2016 within Chicago, Austin, Cleveland, Jacksonville, Philadelphia, Las Vegas, San Diego, New York City, Charleston, Memphis and Los Angeles. Online auditions were also accepted. As with the previous year, the judges' auditions were filmed in March and held at the Pasadena Civic Auditorium in Los Angeles. The Judge Cuts stage of the competition included comedian Chris Hardwick, media personality DJ Khaled, actress Laverne Cox and singer Seal as guest judges.

After eight years of hosting, Nick Cannon faced criticism from NBC over a joke he made on his 2017 Showtime comedy special Stand Up, Don't Shoot, which the network deemed as potentially racist. Cannon determined it was best to leave AGT rather than face the possibility of being fired by the network, announcing his resignation from the program on February 13, 2017 (a month before production of the twelfth season began). Although the network would not accept his announcement to begin with (owing to the fact that Cannon was still under contract to host AGT), the network eventually agreed that his decision was the best course of action under the circumstances, and sought to find a replacement before the new season began. On March 12, television personality Tyra Banks was unveiled as the new host, prior to filming commencing.

Of the participants who auditioned for this season, thirty-six secured a place in the live quarter-finals, with twelve quarter-finalists in each one. Among these included: singing ventriloquist Darci Lynne, singer and ukeleleist Mandy Harvey, singer Christian Guardino, glow-light dance troupe Light Balance and singer Angelina Green, who had each received a golden buzzer from the main judges and host; singer Angelica Hale, singer and guitarist Chase Goehring, singer Celine Tam and soul singer Johnny Manuel, who had each received a golden buzzer from the guest judges; vocal group Final Draft, comic daredevil Bello Nock and video-mappers Oskar and Gaspar, who were chosen as Wildcard quarter-finalists. About twenty-two quarter-finalists advanced and split between the two semi-finals, including dog tricks act Pompeyo Family Dogs (chosen as the Wildcard semi-finalist), with ten semi-finalists securing a place in the finals. The following below lists the results of each participant's overall performance in this season:

 |  |  |  | 
 |  Wildcard Quarter-finalist |  Wildcard Semi-finalist
 Golden Buzzer - Auditions |  Golden Buzzer - Judge Cuts

  Ages denoted for a participant(s), pertain to their final performance for this season.
  Locations for members of this group were not disclosed on the program.
  The ages of these participants were not disclosed on the program.
  The age denoted here pertains to the owner of the dogs in this act; the age range for the animal group was not disclosed by their owner.
  Sara & Hero involved a second dog in their live round performances; the latter value denotes the age of the dog Hero only.

Quarter-finals summary
 Buzzed Out |  Judges' choice | 
 |  |

Quarter-final 1 (August 15) 
Guest Performers, Results Show: Grace VanderWaal

Quarter-final 2 (August 22) 
Guest Performers, Results Show: Circus 1903

  Due to a technical issue, Light Balance's performance was based on their earlier dress rehearsal for the quarter-final.
  Demain Aditya's performance suffered from technical difficulties during the live broadcast, due to a fault in the participant's equipment for his routine.
  Pompeyo Family Dogs were later appointed as the judges' WildCard semi-finalists.

Quarter-final 3 (August 29) 
Guest Performers, Results Show: Mat Franco, Piff the Magic Dragon, and Jon Dorenbos

Semi-finals summary
 Buzzed Out |  Judges' choice | 
 |  |

Semi-final 1 (September 5–6) 
Guest Performers, Results Show: The Clairvoyants

Semi-final 2 (September 12) 
Guest Performers, Results Show: Absinthe

  Due to the majority vote for Diavolo, Klum's voting intention was not revealed.

Finals (September 19–20)
 |  |  | 

  Angelica Hale and Kechi Okwuchi conducted a joint routine for their second performance, and thus shared the same guest performers.

Ratings
The following ratings are based upon those published by Nielsen Media Research after this season's broadcast:

Specials

Incident
During the 2017 season of America's Got Talent, the program paid tribute to American physician Brandon Rodgers, who auditioned for a place in the competition but died following a fatal accident after conducting his performance, on 11 June. 2017. His performance was not shown by producers during the audition episodes, as it was felt unwise to do so without consent from his family, but was later aired as a tribute during the Judge Cuts episode that was broadcast on July 11.

References

2017 American television seasons
America's Got Talent seasons